The Moldovan Women's Cup is the annual cup competition of women's football teams in Moldova. It was first contested in 1997.

List of finals
The list of finals:

Performance by club

References

External links
Federation website

Mol
Women's football competitions in Moldova
Recurring sporting events established in 2007